Stanford University has many centers and institutes dedicated to the study of various specific topics. These centers and institutes may be within a department, within a school but across departments, an independent laboratory, institute or center reporting directly to the dean of research and outside any school, or semi-independent of the university itself.

Independent laboratories, institutes and centers
These report directly to the vice-provost and dean of research and are outside any school though any faculty involved in them must belong to a department in one of the schools. These include Bio-X and Spectrum in the area of Biological and Life Sciences; Precourt Institute for Energy and Woods Institute for the Environment in the Environmental Sciences area; the Center for Advanced Study in the Behavioral Sciences (CASBS), the Center for the Study of Language and Information (CSLI) (see below), Freeman Spogli Institute for International Studies (FSI) (see below), Human-Sciences and Technologies Advance Research Institute (H-STAR), Stanford Center on Longevity (SCL), Stanford Humanities Center (see below), and the Stanford Institute for Economic Policy Research (SIEPR) in the area of Humanities and Social Sciences; and, for Physical Sciences, the Edward L. Ginzton Laboratory, the Geballe Laboratory for Advanced Materials, the Kavli Institute for Particle Astrophysics and Cosmology, Photon Ultrafast Laser Science and Engineering (PULSE), Stanford Institute for Materials and Energy Sciences (SIMES), and W. W. Hansen Experimental Physics Laboratory (HEPL).

Center for the Study of Language and Information
The Center for the Study of Language and Information (CSLI) is an independent research center at Stanford University. Founded in 1983 by philosophers, computer scientists, linguists, and psychologists from Stanford, SRI International, and Xerox PARC, it strives to study all forms of information and improve how humans and computers acquire and process it.

CSLI was initially funded by a US$15 million grant from the System Development Foundation (SDF) for the Situated Language Project, the name of which reflects the strong influence of the work on situation semantics by philosophers John Perry and Jon Barwise, two of the initial leaders of CSLI. This funding supported operations for the first few years as well as the construction of Cordura Hall. Subsequent funding has come from research grants and from an industrial affiliates program.

CSLI's publications branch, founded and still headed by Dikran Karagueuzian, has grown into an important publisher of work in linguistics and related fields. Researchers associated with CSLI include Ronald Kaplan, Patrick Suppes, Edward N. Zalta, the mathematicians Keith Devlin, and Solomon Feferman, the linguists Ivan Sag and Joan Bresnan, Annie Zaenen, Lauri Karttunen, and psychologists Herb Clark, B. J. Fogg and Clifford Nass.

CSLI houses the Stanford Encyclopedia of Philosophy. It also housed the Reuters Digital Vision Program.

Directors 
Jon Barwise 1983–1985
John Perry 1985–1986, 1993–1999
Thomas Wasow 1986–1987, 2006–2007
John Etchemendy 1990–1993
David Israel c. 1999–2000
Byron Reeves c. 2001–2005
Stanley Peters 2008–2013
Chris Potts 2013–present

Freeman Spogli Institute for International Studies

The Freeman Spogli Institute for International Studies is a university-wide research and teaching institution at Stanford devoted to understanding international problems, policies, and institutions. The institute produces interdisciplinary scholarly research, engages in outreach to policymakers and public institutions throughout the world, and trains scholars and future leaders on international issues. Its teaching programs include the graduate-level Master of International Policy as well as honors programs in international security and in democracy, development, and the rule of law. The school is a full member of the Association of Professional Schools of International Affairs (APSIA), a group of schools of public policy, public administration, and international studies.

FSI's core and affiliated faculty represent a range of academic backgrounds and perspectives, including medicine, law, engineering, history, political science, economics, and sociology. The faculty's research and teaching focus on a variety of issues, including governance, domestic and international health policy, migration, development, and security. Their work often examines regional dynamics in areas such as Asia, Europe, Africa and Latin America. FSI faculty conduct research, lead interdisciplinary research programs, educate graduate and undergraduate students, and organize policy outreach that engages Stanford in addressing some of the world's most pressing problems.

The institute is composed of 12 centers and programs, including six major research centers:
Center on Democracy, Development and the Rule of Law (CDDRL)
Center on Food Security and the Environment (FSE)
Center for Health Policy, Primary Care and Outcomes Research (CHP/PCOR)
Center for International Security and Cooperation (CISAC)
The Europe Center (TEC)
 Walter H. Shorenstein Asia–Pacific Research Center (APARC)

History
The institute was founded in 1987 following a faculty committee review that concluded Stanford "should be leading the way in International Studies as we do in science and technology", encompassing interdisciplinary teaching, research, public service and administrative functions. It was first called the institute for International Studies, and was created under the direction of former Stanford president Richard Wall Lyman.

The institute was renamed the Freeman Spogli Institute for International Studies in 2005 following a $50 million gift made by Stanford alumni Bradford M. Freeman and Ronald P. Spogli.

The immediate past director of FSI was Mariano-Florentino Cuéllar, the former Stanley Morrison Professor of Law at Stanford Law School, a former official in the Obama and Clinton presidential administrations, and current justice of the California Supreme Court. Previous directors include Stanford President Emeritus Gerhard Casper; Coit D. Blacker, who served as Special Assistant to the President for National Security Affairs and Senior Director for Russian, Ukrainian and Eurasian Affairs at the National Security Council under National Security Advisor Anthony Lake during the Clinton administration; David Holloway; Walter Falcon; and Stanford President Emeritus Richard Lyman.

FSI appoints faculty and research staff, funds research and scholarly initiatives, directs research projects, and sponsors lectures, policy seminars and conferences. By tradition, FSI undertakes joint faculty appointments with Stanford's seven schools and draws faculty together from the university's academic departments and schools to conduct interdisciplinary research on international issues that transcend academic boundaries.

The institute is home to 40 billeted faculty members – most with joint appointments – and 115 affiliated faculty members with a wide range of academic perspectives.

In addition to its six centers, the institute sponsors the Ford Dorsey Master's in International Policy, the Inter-University Center for Japanese Language Studies, the Program on Energy & Sustainable Development, the Rural Education Action Program, the Stanford Center at Peking University, and the Stanford Program on International and Cross-Cultural Education.

Directors
 2015–present Michael McFaul
 2013–2015 Mariano-Florentino Cuéllar
 2012–2013 Gerhard Casper
 2003–2012 Coit D. Blacker
 1998–2003 David Holloway
 1991–1998 Walter Falcon
 1987–1991 Richard Wall Lyman

Stanford Humanities Center

Founded in 1980, the Stanford Humanities Center is a multidisciplinary research institute dedicated to advancing knowledge about culture, philosophy, history, and the arts.

History
Since its founding in 1980, the Stanford Humanities Center has been sponsoring advanced research into the historical, philosophical, literary, artistic, and cultural dimensions of the human experience. The Humanities Center's annual fellows, international visitors, research workshops, digital humanities laboratory, and roughly fifty annual public events strengthen the intellectual and creative life of the university, foster innovative and interdisciplinary scholarship and teaching, and enrich our understanding of our common humanity. The humanities support democratic culture by nurturing an informed citizenry and seeking solutions to society's most formidable challenges.

Fellowships
The center offers approximately twenty-five year-long residential fellowships to Stanford and non-Stanford scholars at different career stages, giving them the opportunity to pursue their research in a supportive intellectual community.

Research Workshops
Each year, Stanford faculty and graduate students create fifteen diverse research workshops to ask new intellectual questions that often challenge disciplinary boundaries. In addition to providing a space for incubating new ideas in a collegial setting, the workshops professionalize graduate students by introducing them to the conventions of academic life.

Manuscript Review Workshops 
Assembling a team of faculty experts from Stanford and other universities, the Manuscript Review workshops provide critical feedback to junior faculty preparing monographs or other academic manuscripts of similar scope for submission for publication.

Public Lectures
The center brings eminent scholars, public intellectuals, and renowned critics to the Stanford campus for lectures and interdisciplinary conferences that enrich the Stanford community with a lively exchange of ideas. Speakers have included Isabel Allende, Roger Chartier, Stephen Jay Gould, Douglas Hofstadter, Gayatri Spivak, Marilynne Robinson, David Adjaye, David Eggers, and other well-known scholars.

Digital Humanities 
The Humanities Center, with the Center for Spatial and Textual Analysis (CESTA), is expanding the possibilities of humanities research and teaching at Stanford by creating opportunities for the discovery and dissemination of new knowledge. Humanities Center scholars are on the forefront of innovation with access to new digital tools to interpret the human experience.

International Visitors Program 
The center's short-term visitorships draw distinguished international scholars to Stanford to share their research in lectures and seminars with Stanford faculty and students.

Hume Undergraduate Fellowships 
The Humanities Center awards Hume Humanities Honors Fellowships to Stanford seniors writing an honors thesis in a humanities department. In residence for an academic year, Hume fellows contribute to the collegial life of the center and receive intellectual guidance and mentoring from staff and fellows.

Directors
Ian P. Watt, 1980–1985
Bliss Carnochan, 1985–1991
Herbert Lindenberger, 1991–1992 (interim)
Wanda Corn, 1992–1995
Keith Baker, 1995–2000
Peter Stansky, 2000–2001
John Bender, 2001–2008
Aron Rodrigue, 2008–2013
Caroline Winterer, 2013–present

Distinguished Careers Institute
The Distinguished Careers Institute (DCI), established in 2014, is a year-long residential fellowship for approximately 20 individuals who have already established leadership careers. Fellows are selected based on "how their participation in the program will shape their future life journeys" as well as "what future Fellows will contribute to the program and the broader global community."

Stanford High School Program
The collaboration among Stanford University's office for Digital Education, the Department of Computer Science, and the Graduate School of Education established Stanford's first dual-enrollment program for high school students from underrepresented backgrounds, which served as an impetus for the establishment of the Qualia Global Scholars Program.

Other research centers

Stanford Artificial Intelligence Laboratory 
The Stanford Artificial Intelligence Laboratory (also known as the Stanford AI Lab, or SAIL) is the artificial intelligence (AI) research laboratory of Stanford University. The current director is Professor Chris Manning.

Early years
SAIL was started in 1963 by John McCarthy, after he moved from Massachusetts Institute of Technology to Stanford. Lester D. "Les" Earnest, also previously of MIT, served as executive officer (self-deprecatingly, "Chief Bureaucrat") at SAIL from 1965 to 1980. During the same years, SAIL was housed in the D.C. Power building, named not for "Direct Current" but rather for Donald Clinton Power, who held the positions of president, C.E.O. and chairman of General Telephone & Electronics Corporation (later GTE Corporation) between 1951 and 1971. GT&E donated the unfinished building to Stanford University after abandoning plans to establish a research center there. During this period SAIL was one of the leading centers for AI research and an early ARPANET site.

D.C. Power was on a hill overlooking Felt Lake in the foothills of the Santa Cruz Mountains behind Stanford.
It was about 5 miles (8 km) from the main campus, at 1600 Arastradero Road, midway between Page Mill Road and Alpine Road. 
This area was, and remains, quite rural in nature. Combined with the rather extreme 1960s architecture of the place, this remote setting led to a certain isolation. Some people who worked there reported feeling as if they were already in the future. The building was demolished in 1986; as of 2003, the site is home to Portola Pastures (an equestrian center adjacent to the Arastradero Open Space Preserve).

SAIL created the WAITS operating system on a computer called SAIL. WAITS ran on various models of Digital Equipment Corporation PDP computers, starting with the PDP-6, then the KA10 and KL10. WAITS also ran on Foonly systems at CCRMA and LLL. The SAIL system was shut down in 1991.

SAIL, the Stanford Artificial Intelligence Language, was developed by Dan Swinehart and Bob Sproull of the Stanford AI Lab in 1970.

Alumni of the original SAIL played a major role in many Silicon Valley firms, becoming founders of now-large firms such as Cisco Systems and Sun Microsystems as well as smaller companies such as Vicarm Inc. (acquired by Unimation), Foonly, Elxsi, Imagen, Xidex, Valid Logic Systems, and D.E. Shaw & Co. Research accomplishments at SAIL were many, including in the fields of speech recognition and robotics. Among notable people that had worked at SAIL before its closure included Raj Reddy, Hans Moravec, Alan Kay, Victor Scheinman, Larry Tesler, Don Knuth, and Edward Feigenbaum.

Demise and rebirth
In 1980, SAIL's activities were merged into the university's Computer Science Department and it moved into Margaret Jacks Hall on the main Stanford campus.

SAIL was reopened in 2004, now in the Gates Computer Science Building, with Sebastian Thrun becoming its new director. SAIL's 21st century mission is to "change the way we understand the world"; its researchers contribute to fields such as bioinformatics, cognition, computational geometry, computer vision, decision theory, distributed systems, game theory, general game playing, image processing, information retrieval, knowledge systems, logic, machine learning, multi-agent systems, natural language, neural networks, planning, probabilistic inference, sensor networks, and robotics. The best-known achievement of the new SAIL is the Stanley self-driving car that won the 2005 DARPA Grand Challenge.

Stanford Center for Entrepreneurial Studies
The Center for Entrepreneurial Studies (CES) at Stanford University is a multidisciplinary business oriented program targeted to both undergraduate and graduate students. It incorporates courses from Stanford University School of Engineering and Stanford Graduate School of Business. It also incorporates Stanford Mayfield Scholars Program that seeks to give select undergraduate students an opportunity to take business related coursework and to intern in high tech startups. CES was founded by Tom Byers and Charles A. Holloway.

Center for Computer Research in Music and Acoustics

The Stanford University Center for Computer Research in Music and Acoustics (CCRMA), founded by John Chowning, is a multi-discipline facility where composers and researchers work together using computer-based technology both as an artistic medium and as a research tool. CCRMA's director is Chris Chafe. CCRMA's current faculty includes a mix of musicians and engineers including Julius Smith, Jonathan Berger, Max Mathews (emeritus), Ge Wang, Takako Fujioka, Tom Rossing, Jonathan Abel, Marina Bosi, David Berners, Patricia Alessandrini, Jay Kadis, and Fernando Lopez-Lezcano. Emeritus professor Max Mathews died in 2011.

Widely used digital sound synthesis techniques like FM synthesis and digital waveguide synthesis were developed at CCRMA and licensed to industry partners. The FM synthesis patent brought Stanford $20 million before it expired, making it (in 1994) "the second most lucrative licensing agreement in Stanford's history".

Stanford CCRMA is a research center, studying areas of audio and technology including composition, computer music, physical modeling, audio signal processing, sound recording and reproduction, psychoacoustics, acoustics, music information retrieval, audio networking, and spatial sound. The center houses academic courses for Stanford students as well as seminars, small interest group meetings, summer workshops and colloquia for the broader community. Concerts of computer and experimental music are presented regularly throughout year.

The Knoll

Almost 100 years ago, this Spanish Gothic residence, known as the Knoll, was originally designed by Louis Christian Mullgardt, and built as a residence for the university's president. In 1946, the building became home to the Music Department, and then in 1986, CCRMA took over residency.

Damaged in 1989 during the Loma Prieta earthquake, the Knoll nonetheless housed CCRMA in its damaged condition until a complete internal reconstruction between 2004 and 2005. The reopening of the facility was celebrated in the Spring of 2005 with the CCRMA: newStage Festival. This unique building now comprises several state-of-the-art music studios and top-notch research facilities, hosting a variety of students, artists and scientists.

CCRMA is affiliated with the Center for Computer Assisted Research in the Humanities (CCARH), also located at Stanford. CCARH conducts research on constructing computer databases for music and on creating programs that allow researchers to access, analyze, print, and electronically perform the music.

Stanford Institute for Creativity and the Arts (SiCa)
The Stanford Institute for Creativity and the Arts (SiCa), established in 2006, serves as the core programmatic hub for the Stanford Arts Initiative, leading the development of new undergraduate arts programs, hosting artists in residence, awarding grants for multidisciplinary arts research and teaching, incubating collaborative performances and exhibitions with campus partners and other institutions, and providing centralized communication for arts events and programs at Stanford University.

National Performance of Dams Program
The Department of Civil and Environmental Engineering maintains the National Performance of Dams Program, a national database of structural and operational data related to dam systems in the U.S. Begun in 1994, this program provides data to the dam engineering and safety community about the in-service performance of dam systems. The analysis of this data covering both successful operations and incidents, including failures, is intended to lead to improvements in design and requirements, engineering processes and standards, operational procedures and guidelines, and public policy development.

Michelle R. Clayman Institute for Gender Research
Founded in 1974, and named after economist Michelle R. Clayman, the Michelle R. Clayman Institute for Gender Research at Stanford University is one of the nation's oldest research organizations focused on the study of gender. The Clayman Institute designs basic interdisciplinary research, creates knowledge, networks people and ideas at Stanford, nationally, and internationally to effect change and promote gender equality. The Clayman Institute plays an integral role in the Stanford community by bringing together local, national and international scholars and thought leaders from across disciplines to create knowledge and effect change. The place where the Clayman Institute is located was renamed the Carolyn Lewis Attneave House in 2019. It was formerly named Serra House after Junípero Serra.

History 
In 1972 faculty and graduate students in the feminist movement were the impetus behind the formation of the institute. In 1974, the Center for Research on Women (CROW) was the first interdisciplinary center or institute of its kind and quickly built a strong reputation under the direction of Myra Strober, the founding Director. The reputation of CIGR grew outside Stanford, and the University of Chicago Press chose Stanford as the base of the second five-year rotation of its new interdisciplinary journal, Signs. 
In 1983 the institute was renamed the Institute for Research on Women and Gender (IRWG) and continued to expand the gender conversation with the “Difficult Dialogues” program, which ran in the 1990s through 2004. In 2004, the new director, Professor Londa Schiebinger, a historian of science, formed a plan to create a series of research initiatives on gender issues, backed by a research fellowship program, that would attract scholars from Stanford and abroad. With the help of matching funds from the Hewlett Foundation and strong support from the institute's Advisory Council, Schiebinger spearheaded a fundraising drive to create an endowment for the institute. IRWG was renamed in honor of Michelle R. Clayman, the major donor in the campaign, who serves as the chair of the institute's Advisory Council.

Research 
The Clayman Institute designs basic research and supports the creation of knowledge through its Fellowships and interdisciplinary programs. Recent reports/publications include:
 Gendered Innovations in Science and Engineering, Londa Schiebinger, ed., 2008.
 Dual-Career Academic Couples: What Universities Need to Know. The Michelle R. Clayman Institute, 2008. This Clayman Institute research study shows that over 70% of faculty are in dual-career relationships. This report tackles tough questions and recommends policies to maximize options.
 Climbing the Technical Ladder: Obstacles and Solutions for Mid-Level Women in Information Technology. The Michelle R. Clayman Institute and the Anita Borg Institute, 2008. This report provides an in-depth look into the barriers to retention and advancement of technical women in Silicon Valley's high tech industry and provides practical recommendations to employers on overcoming these barriers.

Fellowships 
The Clayman Institute runs two fellowship programs. The Faculty Research Fellowships seek to drive intellectual and social innovation through interdisciplinary gender studies. They include residential fellowships for tenured, tenure-track, and postdoctoral scholars from Stanford University, and U.S. and foreign universities. The Clayman Institute also offers Graduate Dissertation Fellowships for Stanford University doctoral students. Fellowships are awarded to students who are in the writing stages of their dissertations, and whose research focuses on women and/or gender.

Directors 
1974–77 Myra Strober
1977–79 Diane Middlebrook
1979–84 Myra Strober
1984–85 Marilyn Yalom (deputy director, as acting director)
1985–86 Judith Brown (acting director)
1986–90 Deborah Rhode
1990–97 Iris Litt
1997–2001 Laura Carstensen
2001–04 Barbara Gelpi (acting director)
2004–10 Londa Schiebinger
2010–present Shelley J. Correll

Martin Luther King Jr. Research and Education Institute
Stanford is home to the Martin Luther King Jr. Research and Education Institute which grew out of and still contains the Martin Luther King Jr. Papers Project, a collaboration with the King Center to publish the King papers held by the King Center.

Stanford Internet Observatory
The Stanford Internet Observatory is a is a multidisciplinary program for the study of abuse in information technologies, with a focus on social media, established in 2019. It is part of the Stanford Cyber Policy Center, a joint initiative of the Freeman Spogli Institute for International Studies and Stanford Law School.

Affiliations
Stanford's Center for Computer Research and Acoustics is part of a consortium with CNMAT and the Institut de Recherche et Coordination Acoustique/Musique (IRCAM) in Paris.

See also

 Hoover Institution , a conservative think tank which is affiliated with Stanford University. The Hoover Institution staffed numerous positions in the Trump administration.
 SLAC National Accelerator Laboratory, a particle physics research facility. Run by Stanford University under the programmatic direction of the United States Department of Energy
 SRI International, originally the Stanford Research Institute, but independent since 1970

References

External links
 Dean of Research list of Independent Laboratories, Institutes and Centers
 Research Centers (not independent)
 SAIL homepage
 CCRMA homepage
 Searchable CCRMA archive: https://web.archive.org/web/20090118104407/http://www.nabble.com/CCRMA-f2875.html
 CSLI's website
Official Web Site of FSI
Arts Initiative/SiCa Website
Stanford Humanities Center main website
National Performance of Dams Program (NPDP)
Michelle R. Clayman Institute
Oral history interviews on the Michelle R. Clayman Institute with Nannerl Keohane and Marilyn Yalom, Stanford Historical Society Oral History Program
 Oral history interviews with Terry Winograd, Raj Reddy, Bruce Buchanan and Allen Newell. Charles Babbage Institute, University of Minnesota, Minneapolis.

Stanford
Stanford
Stanford
Artificial intelligence laboratories
Computer science institutes in the United States